Andrejs Upīts (4 December 1877, Skrīveri parish, Russian Empire – 17 November 1970, Riga, Latvian SSR) was a Latvian teacher, poet, short story writer.

Career and literary activity
Andrejs Upīts, while writing for the newspaper "Mājas viesis" under the pseudonym Andrei Araji in 1892, published his first articles, Parunas, Skrīveros uzrakstītas (Recorded Proverbs of Skrīveri) (No. 15) and Kā mūsu senči agrāk Vidzemē dzīvojuši (How Our Ancestors Once Lived in Vidzeme) (No. 20). Upīts wrote novels, stories, drama, tragedy, comedy, poetry, satire, journalism, and literary criticism. His children's novel, Sūnu ciema zēni (The Boys of Moss Village), is included in the compulsory reading list of schools. He was one of the more multifaceted Latvian writers. Upīts' heroes possess striking character and he used a rich language.

In 1940 Upīts was appointed the editor-in-chief of Karogs and served in the post until 1941. His 1945 novel Zaļā zeme (Verdant Land) received the USSR State Prize in 1946. Between 1945 and 1946 he served again as the editor-in-chief of Karogs. His Sociālistiskā reālisma jautājumi literatūrā (Problems of Socialist Realism in Literature) won the Latvian SSR State Prize in 1957.

His works were banned twice: the first time after Kārlis Ulmanis' coup of 1934, and the second during the years of the Soviet regime, when his performance of his play, Ziedošais tuksnesis (The Blooming Desert) was prohibited at the Dailes Theatre and censors prohibited distribution of his book, Literatūras vēsture (The History of Literature).

Significant works

Novels 
 Jauni avoti (1909)
 Sieviete (1910)
 Zīda tīklā (1912)
 Pēdējais latvietis (1913)
 Zelts (1914)
 Renegāti (1915)
 Ziemeļa vējš (1921)
 Perkona pievārtē (1922)
 Pa varavīksnes tiltu (1926)
 Zem naglota papēža (1928)
 Jāņa Robežnieka nāve (1932)
 Vecās ēnas (1934)
 Zaļā zeme (1945)
 Plaisa mākoņos (1951)

Plays 
 Dzimumdienas rītā (1905)
 Balss un atbalss / triloģija (1911)
 Žanna d'Arka (1930)
 Spartaks (1943)
 Ziņģu Ješkas uzvara (1933)
 Apburtais loks (1929)
 Mirabo (1926)
 Kaijas lidojums (1925)
 Peldētāja Zuzanna (1922)

Poetry 
 Mazas drāmas (1911)

Prose 
 Jauni avoti (1909)
 Sieviete (1910)
 Zīda tīklā (1912)
 Pēdējais latvietis (1913)
 Ziemeļa vējš (1921)
 Zelts (1921)
 Pērkona pievārtē (1922)
 Renegāti (1922)
 Pa varavīksnes tiltu (1926)
 Zem naglota papēža (1928)
 Jāņa Robežnieka pārnākšana (1932)
 Jāņa Robežnieka nāve (1933, Vecas ēnas (1934)
 Smaidoša lapa (1937)
 Laikmetu griežos (1937 1940)
 Māsas Ģertrūdes noslēpums (1939)
 Zaļā zeme (1945)
 Plaisa mākoņos (1951)

 Short stories 
 Mazas komēdijas (1-2) (1909 1910)
 Nemiers (1912)
 Vēju kauja (1920)
 Aiz paradīzes vārtiem (1922)
 Kailā dzīvība (1926)
 Stāsti par mācītājiem (1930)
 Sūnu ciema zēni / garstāsts jaunatnei (1940)
 Noveles (1943)

Partial bibliography
 McCall's: August 1964; Vol. XCI, No. 11 (featuring The Young Crane by Andrejs Upīts and Illustrated by Maurice Sendak)Outside Paradise and Other Stories (1970)Cause and effect (Soviet short stories) (1977)Selected stories (1978)Problems of Socialist Realism in Literature''

References

External links

1877 births
1970 deaths
People from Aizkraukle Municipality
People from Kreis Riga
Communist Party of Latvia politicians
Deputies of the People's Saeima
Members of the Supreme Soviet of the Latvian Soviet Socialist Republic, 1947–1951
Latvian writers
20th-century Latvian poets
Latvian male poets
Academic staff of the University of Latvia
People's Writers of the Latvian SSR
Stalin Prize winners
Heroes of Socialist Labour
Recipients of the Order of Lenin
Recipients of the Order of the Red Banner of Labour